Dilemma is a 1999 novel from Australian author Jon Cleary. It is the sixteenth book featuring Sydney detective Scobie Malone and involves his investigation of a murder in his parents' town and a kidnapping.

References

External links
 Dilemma at AustLit (subscription required)

1999 Australian novels
HarperCollins books
William Morrow and Company books
Novels by Jon Cleary